Darrick Leonard Vaughn (born October 2, 1978 in Houston, Texas) is a former American football defensive back in the NFL for the Atlanta Falcons and the Houston Texans. He was drafted in the seventh round of the 2000 NFL Draft. He played college football at Southwest Texas State University.

References

Darrick Vaughn. Pro Football Reference. Retrieved 2021-02-07.

1978 births
Living people
People from Houston
American football defensive backs
American football return specialists
Atlanta Falcons players
Houston Texans players
Texas State University alumni